Psoinae is a small subfamily of beetles in the family Bostrichidae.

References

Bibliography

  

Bostrichidae
Beetle subfamilies